Edi Buro (born September 19, 1987) is a Bosnian  soccer player who currently is The Director of Coaching at White Bear Soccer Club. Edi is a former player of the Minnesota United FC in the North American Soccer League, FC Rijeka, FK Buducnost, FC Travnik. During 2017-2018 season Edi has led U16 Premier girls to  US Club National Championship in Colorado.

Career
Buro played college soccer at Hamline University, before returning to Bosnia with NK Travnik and FK Budućnost Banovići of the Premier League of Bosnia and Herzegovina.

Buro returned to the country he was raised in by signing with Minnesota Stars FC at the beginning of their 2012 NASL season.

In 2015 Buro was named the Director of Coaching for the White Bear Soccer Club in White Bear Lake, MN.

References

1987 births
Living people
American soccer players
Minnesota United FC (2010–2016) players
North American Soccer League players
Association football defenders